The Body of Christopher Creed is a young adult novel by Carol Plum-Ucci. It tells the story of a high school student whose life is unravelled when he tries to solve the mystery of a classmate's sudden disappearance. The novel won the Michael L. Printz Honor Book Award.

Plot summary

Torey Adams, the narrator, moves to a new town and begins his senior year at Rothborne, a boarding school. As he starts thinking about the school year ahead, he remembers the strange events of his junior year, including the disappearance of his former classmate Christopher Creed. Christopher disappeared without a trace, apart from an email that he sent to the principal. The prelude concludes with Torey sending an email containing his retelling of the events.

In the past, Torey and his friends read the email from Christopher. It suggests that Christopher either committed suicide or ran away. The email references a number of people in town who Christopher admires as guys who have "everything," including Torey and one of his friends. This makes Torey more concerned about Creed's disappearance and what has become of him. Torey talks about his concerns with his girlfriend, Leandra, who brushes them off.

At school, Torey begins to feel alienated from his friend Alex. Ali McDermott, a girl at school who suffers from negative rumours, talks to Torey about Creed and asks him to come over to her house that night, as she wants to show him something. At her house, Torey and Ali watch the Creed family, observing Mrs. Creed's controlling behaviour and her relationship with Christopher's brothers. Torey meets Ali's boyfriend, Bo, who is a "boon" (a local slang term for the "really bad kids" who come from the boondocks) and is rumoured to be a violent criminal, but turns out to be caring and protective, despite his tough guy demeanour.

Torey comes up with a plan: he will go to a nearby payphone and call the Creeds, demanding that they meet him and bring money in exchange for information about Chris. Meanwhile, Bo will break in and take Christopher's diary. The plan backfires, and all three are brought to police headquarters. Bo confesses to the phone call despite his innocence. At the Adams' home, Torey's mother tells Torey and Ali the story of Digger Haines and his father Bob; Digger ran away from home following personal tragedy, and Bob vanished after years of unpleasant rumours. Torey's mother hands Ali a notebook that Bo claimed was Ali's, but it turns out to actually be Chris's diary. The diary talks about Chris's relationship with a shy girl called Isabella, and states that one of them would die in the woods.

At school the next day, Torey becomes further distanced from his friends when they question him about Bo Richardson. He successfully avoids his friends and leaves feigning sickness during the school day. Leandra calls Torey, and when Ali picks up the phone, she accuses him of sleeping with Ali. Torey and Ali go to meet Bo, who tells them how he got the diary. Later, Torey finds Isabella in the telephone book, calls her, and leaves a message saying that he is looking for Chris and wants any information she has.

During lunch the next day, the police and Mrs. Creed burst into the school cafeteria to take Bo for questioning. Ali and Torey protest; both confess to the phone call. A few days later when Torey returns home from school he finds a message from Isabella on his answering machine telling him to "come over anytime" to talk about Chris. Ali and Torey go to Isabella's house and find out that she did not have a relationship with him, but did have sex with him. Ali and Torey discover that Chris imagined the whole relationship and wrote down false information in his diary. Isabella also has Torey and Ali meet her psychic Aunt Vera, who proceeds to warn Torey that when he is alone he "will find him. In the woods."

Upon returning to the Adams' home, Ali and Torey decide to go to the woods to see if they can find Chris's body. When Torey turns to return home, he sees and follows what seems to be an Indian ghost. After meditating on events and coming to the belief that Chris would not have endured everything he had only to commit suicide, Torey falls into a subterranean Indian burial ground, breaking his leg when a boulder falls on it. When he gets closer, he finds a dead body that he believes to belong to Chris, but is traumatized when the corpse undergoes rapid, visible decomposition due to its sudden exposure to fresh air. Torey is sent to a mental hospital to recover, but has lost all desire to associate with the people of Steepleton and their incessant gossip. He finishes his junior year of high school at home.

The epilogue of the story returns to Rothborne, at the end of the school year. Torey finishes the school year reviewing his written epilogue to the events of Steepleton, and the responses he's received from people he's reached out to as possible aliases of Christopher Creed. He remains convinced that Chris is alive, and that someday he will find him and tell the story of what happened.

Characters
Victor "Torey" Adams, a senior at the fictional Rothborne, a boarding school, is the narrator of the novel. What begins as a mild interest in Chris's disappearance turns into a desire to help solve the mystery of Chris's disappearance. Torey is conflicted throughout the book between his friends and those who want to help find Chris. At the beginning of the novel, Torey is described as "your basic guy" and wears his hair in a ponytail.
Bo Richardson, a tough rebel from the boondocks of Steepleton has "a good guy streak that [is]  just as wide, probably wider, than his bad guy streak." He has a mean exterior but cares deeply for his girlfriend Ali McDermott, her brother Greg, and his own siblings. Bo eventually takes a liking to Torey despite their differences throughout the story. Bo is infuriated with Mrs. Creed for accusing him of the murder of her son and is determined to prove his innocence.
Christopher "Chris" Creed, the "weird guy" from Steepleton, vanishes after sending an e-mail to Glen Ames, the principal, hinting at the possibility that he has ran away or taken his own life.
Isabella Karzden, a laid-back waitress, with whom Chris had an imaginary relationship. She admits to helping Chris lose his virginity but makes it clear when introduced in the novel that she did not have a relationship with him.
Sylvia Creed, Chris Creed’s mother, who accuses Bo Richardson of murdering her son.
Alex Arrington, Torey Adam's best friend and Renee Bowen’s boyfriend. He plays football and is in a band with Torey. He is also very smart and tech savvy, having hacked into school files and discovering the email Christopher Creed sent to the principal before his disappearance. During the novel, he begins to believe that Chris is dead and says to Torey that "{You and Bo] shot him in the woods". This causes an argument which leads Alex and Torey’s friendship to collapse at the end of the novel.
Leandra, a cute, cheerleader with "long reddish hair" who is Torey Adam's girlfriend. She goes to the "Pentecostal church every Sunday," but by "Monday [she is] calling people "dirtbag" and "turbo slut".  Later in the novel, she and Torey break up because of his involvement with the Christopher Creed case and his newfound friendship with Ali McDermott.
Chief Officer Bowen, the Chief of the Steepleton police force, and Renee Bowen’s father. He initially comes off as a bully to Bo Richardson, Torey, and Ali.  Allegedly hit 'Bo' in the interrogation room causing him to resign from his job. It is revealed by Bo that he has been having an affair with Mrs McDermott, much to Renee’s horror.
Dr. Fahdi, the appointed psychiatrist that is hired to help Torey Adams after seeing Bob Haines’ body quickly decompose. He urged Torey to write his story and try to find Chris Creed.
Mrs. McDermott, a mother to Ali and Greg McDermott, who had relationships with many men including the Chief of Police, which caused her divorce.
Leo, a senior who goes to school with Torey and doesn’t care about privacy or personal space. He is "just a little sideways" as described by Torey.
Cartright, a senior prankster who is Torey Adam's roommate at the fictional school Rothborne. He only knows "bits and pieces" of Torey’s story about Chris.
Mr. Creed, father of Chis Creed and husband of Mrs.Creed,
Bob Haines, father of Digger Haines who had "always wanted Digger to go into the Marine Corps". After Digger was unable to join, his life went downhill and later he shot himself in a Lenape burial cave, to be found by Torey Adams.
Digger Haines, son of Bob Haines, who "lost his leg from the knee down" in a motorcycle accident. He left Steepleton and became a lawyer.
Glen Ames, the principal of Steepleton’s high-school and a friend of Digger Haines. He was the recipient of Chris’s goodbye e-mail.
Ali McDermott, a cute cheerleader who is labelled as a slut but is actually a loyal friend and is said to be the cause of the break up between Torey and Leandra. She is also the girlfriend of Bo Richardson. She helped in the case of Christopher Creed.
Renee Bowen, Alex Arrington's girlfriend, also the Police Chief daughter.  She is a mean girl who always accused Bo of Christopher’s disappearance and said her dad will throw him in jail. Renee and Torey have never seen eye to eye, as Renee is best friends with Leandra. She is the first one to turn on Torey after finding out that he has been associating with Bo and Ali.

Major themes 
The Body of Christopher Creed reveals the issues of the questionable nature of  "reality" and the need to "be taken seriously".  In the novel Torey says that every person in Steepleton has their own "version of reality" that "has nothing to do with what’s true" or what's not true. Torey's mother screams at him to "remain calm" instead of addressing the point that he made. Similar situations occur throughout the novel where the children try to address a point and the adults push it aside to avoid the reality of their once "safe world" as Torey explains.

Critics have also noted that The Body of Christopher Creed addresses the issue of the need to "blame others" when tragedy strikes. A Chris Creed Book review states that the novel has an "interesting perspective" about how "cruel" people can be to one another. When "tragedy strikes" the townspeople of Steepleton look for others to blame instead of themselves.
For instance, Mrs. Creed is quick to jump to a conclusion that Bo either "murdered" or is "holding" Chris after Bo is taken into custody, despite there being no evidence of this.  Throughout the novel, the townspeople of Steepleton would rather cover up their problems by blaming others within their community.

Bibliography

References

External links
Carol Plum-Ucci's official website
  The Body of Christopher Creed on Internet Archive
 The Body of Christopher Creed study guide

2000 American novels
American young adult novels
American mystery novels
Children's mystery novels
Novels set in high schools and secondary schools